Four ships of the Royal Navy have borne the name HMS Furnace:

  was a 4-gun bomb vessel launched in 1695 and broken up in 1725.
  was a 14-gun bomb vessel launched in 1740 and sold in 1763.
  was an 8-gun fireship launched in 1779 and sold in 1783.
  was a 12-gun gunvessel launched in 1797 and sold in 1802.

Royal Navy ship names